Conor Dominic Geoffrey Wilkinson (born 23 January 1995) is an English-born Irish footballer who plays as a striker for Walsall.

Club career

Millwall 
Wilkinson began his career at Millwall in 2010 and progressed through the ranks during his three-year stint at the club.

Bolton 
He left the club in the summer of 2013 to join fellow Championship side Bolton Wanderers on a three-year contract. He initially joined the reserve side and has been in good scoring form. In October 2013 Wilkinson along with teammate Chris Lester joined new Conference side Chester on a month's long loan. He made his debut and scored against Aldershot Town, he also played the full 90 minutes. His second appearance for the non-league side against strugglers Hyde where he received first yellow card of his career and he was substituted as Chester won 2–1. He returned to Bolton after making a total of four league appearances and scoring one goal. He returned to the reserve side and his scoring form continued until February when he was loaned to League Two side Torquay United on an emergency one-month loan deal. He was named among the substitutes and made his professional debut a day later against high flying Chesterfield coming on as a 75th minute replacing Jayden Stockley.

Returning to Bolton, he scored three goals in Bolton's pre season for the 2014–15 season and made his competitive debut for Wanderers in their 3–2 League Cup victory over neighbours Bury on 12 August 2014, starting the game before being substituted for Craig Davies in the second half. He joined Oldham Athletic on loan for a month in September 2014, scoring once during his loan spell, in a 2–1 win for Oldham against Walsall.

In December 2014 Wilkinson signed a contract extension with Bolton until 2018. Later on that month he made his first league appearance for Bolton when coming on as a substitute for Craig Davies in a goalless draw at Reading. On 2 February 2015 he moved to Oldham, again on loan, for the duration of the season. His first-team debut came at the Macron Stadium in a 0–0 draw against Ipswich Town.

Loan to Barnsley 
He joined Barnsley on loan in July 2015 for six months. He scored on his debut in a 3–1 defeat at Chesterfield on 8 August 2015.

On 21 January 2016 Wilkinson joined Newport County on an initial one-month loan which was subsequently extended a further month. He made his Newport debut in the starting line up versus Dagenham & Redbridge on 23 January 2016, scoring the second goal in the 2–2 draw.

On 23 March 2016, Wilkinson joined Portsmouth on loan until the end of the season.

On 31 August 2016, Wilkinson joined Chesterfield on loan until January.

Gillingham 
On 29 June 2017, Wilkinson joined Gillingham on a two-year deal for an undisclosed fee.

Leyton Orient 
On 17 June 2019, after scoring 12 league goals in 23 games for Dagenham & Redbridge in the previous season, Wilkinson joined newly promoted League Two side Leyton Orient for an undisclosed fee. Wilkinson was offered a new deal due his contract expiring however decided to join fellow EFL League Two side Walsall F.C.

Walsall 
Wilkinson joined EFL League Two side Walsall on a two-year deal on 1 July 2021.

International career
Wilkinson has been capped at Republic of Ireland U19 and U21 level.

Career statistics

Honours

Club
Bolton Wanderers
EFL League One runner-up (promoted): 2016–17

References

External links

Profile at UEFA

1995 births
Living people
English people of Irish descent
English Football League players
National League (English football) players
Republic of Ireland association footballers
Republic of Ireland youth international footballers
Republic of Ireland under-21 international footballers
Millwall F.C. players
Bolton Wanderers F.C. players
Chester F.C. players
Torquay United F.C. players
Oldham Athletic A.F.C. players
Barnsley F.C. players
Newport County A.F.C. players
Gillingham F.C. players
Dagenham & Redbridge F.C. players
Leyton Orient F.C. players
Walsall F.C. players
Association football forwards